Jharigam is a Vidhan Sabha constituency of Nabarangpur district, Odisha.

This constituency includes Jharigam block, Chandahandi block and 10 Gram panchayats (Badabharandi, Badakumari, Bhamini, Benora, Singisari, Bhandariguda, Chikalpadar, Hirapur, Karagam and Rajpur) of Umerkote  block.

Elected Members

Two elections held during 2009 and 2014.
Elected members from the Jharigam constituency are:
2019: (74): Prakash Chandra Majhi (BJD)
2014: (74): Ramesh Chandra Majhi (BJD)
2009: (74): Ramesh Chandra Majhi (BJD)

2019 Election Result

2014 Election Result
In 2014 election, Biju Janata Dal candidate Ramesh Chandra Majhi defeated Indian National Congress candidate Uldhar Majhi by a margin of 11,196 votes.

2009 Election Result
In 2009 election, Biju Janata Dal candidate Ramesh Chandra Majhi defeated Indian National Congress candidate Jalandhar Majhi by a margin of 22,276 votes.

Notes

References

Assembly constituencies of Odisha
Nabarangpur district